Andi Oddang may refer to:
 Andi Oddang (footballer)
 Andi Oddang (governor)